"Te Pido Perdón" (English: "I Beg For Pardon" or "I Ask for Forgiveness") is the second single by reggaeton artist Tito El Bambino from the special edition of his third studio album El Patrón. The Banda version of this song can be found on Banda El Recodo's album Las Numero Uno.

Track listing
US CD single 
Te Pido Perdón (Album Version) - 2:50
Te Pido Perdón (Instrumental) - 2:50

Official Remixes
Te Pido Perdón [featuring Víctor Manuelle] - 2:50
Te Pido Perdón (Banda Version)[featuring Banda El Recodo] - 2:52 from the Greatest hits Album of Banda El Recodo: Las Numero Uno

Charts

References

2010 singles
Tito El Bambino songs
Banda el Recodo songs
2009 songs
Songs written by Tito El Bambino